Technological University, Thanlyin is a technological university,  located in Thanlyin, Yangon Division, Myanmar. The Ministry of Education run university offers bachelor's degree programs in Engineering and Architecture and master's degree programs in Engineering and Architecture.

It is the second earliest university in Myanmar which has been recognized as an associate member of ASEAN University Network
, and the first ever technological university which has also been certified AUN-QA (ASEAN University Network Quality Assurance) in 2017. And, it will soon be a core member of AUN. In addition, it is also a member of ATU-Net (Asia Technological University Network)
. Then, most of its engineering majors are fully accredited or provisionally accredited by Engineering Education Accreditation Committee. Besides, it has obtained ISO 9001:2008 and 
ISO 9001:2015 certifications from BUREAU VERITAS established in 1828. Lastly, it is ranked 2nd among 33 technological universities, and 8th out of 164 universities around the country.

History
The university's origins trace to the Industrial Training Center (1), founded in March 1993. In November 1995, it became a Government Technological Institute (GTI), offering two-year diplomas on vocational studies. In October 1999, the school was "upgraded" to a Government Technological College (GTC), offering three-year Bachelor of Technology (BTech) programs, and again in January 2007 to the Technological University level, offering bachelor's degree programs in Engineering and Architecture and master's degree programs in Engineering.

It is part of a number of formerly two-year schools that have been promoted to university level in recent years. The military government, which repeatedly closed down schools and universities in the 1990s, has pursued a policy of dispersing students away from major city centers. The university's 125 hectare (310-acre) campus is outside Thanlyin, and actually closer to a smaller town of Kyauktan Township.

In 2007, 461 students graduated with Bachelor of Engineering (BE) or Bachelor of Architecture (BArch) degrees.

Programs
The university offered four-year Bachelor of Technology (BTech), two-year BE and BArch and two-year ME programs. Students are accepted to TU, Thanlyin's undergraduate programs based on their scores from the annual university entrance examinations. Since 2013, the university offers six-year Bachelor of Engineering and Bachelor of Arch. The students who qualify the entry requirement can apply to Technological University (Thanlyin) from any region of Myanmar. In 2019, more than 1000 final year students will graduated and Technological University (Thanlyin) will accept 450 new intake.

Departments

Academic Departments
 Department of Myanmar
 Department of English
 Department of Engineering Mathematics
 Department of Engineering Chemistry
 Department of Engineering Physics

Engineering Departments
 Department of Architecture
 Department of Civil Engineering
 Department of Information Technology Engineering
 Department of Electronic Engineering
 Department of Mechanical Engineering
 Department of Mechatronics Engineering
 Department of Electrical Power Engineering
 Department of Chemical Engineering
 Department of Petroleum Engineering

Supporting Departments
 Department of Student Affairs
 Department of Human Resource Development
 Department of International Relations
 Department of Internal QA

International Affiliations
TTU is a member of Asia Technological University Network (ATU-Net)
, and associate member of ASEAN University Network (AUN) 
It is also a member of SEAMEO Schools' Network
. The university has academic affiliations with many international technological universities.

External links of respective majors
http://ttu.edu.mm/department/architecture-engineering
http://ttu.edu.mm/department/civil-engineering
http://ttu.edu.mm/department/chemical-engineering
http://ttu.edu.mm/department/electrical-power-engineering
http://ttu.edu.mm/department/electronic-engineering
http://ttu.edu.mm/department/information-technology-engineering
http://ttu.edu.mm/department/mechanical-engineering
http://ttu.edu.mm/department/mechatronic-engineering
http://ttu.edu.mm/department/petroleum-engineering

References

See also
 Yangon Technological University
 Mandalay Technological University
 List of Technological Universities in Myanmar

Universities and colleges in Thanlyin
Universities and colleges in Yangon Region
Technological universities in Myanmar
2007 establishments in Myanmar
Educational institutions established in 2007